Tactical Assault Camouflage, also called TACAM, is a 2004 camouflage pattern exclusively used by the National Counterterrorism Center of the United States.

The pattern was designed as an experiment to show the ability of fractal patterns, breaking up a soldier's outline and symmetry. The fractal pattern and harsh geometric figures in the pattern meld well in urban and suburban areas, where it is used.

See also
 TACAM (disambiguation)
 MARPAT

References

Camouflage patterns
Military equipment introduced in the 2000s